Biddestone F.C. was a football club based in Biddestone, near Corsham, Wiltshire, England. Biddestone Football Club has been in existence since the 1920s and the modern day team was established in 1976 as a social team, which competed in the Chippenham & District Sunday League.

They played in the Wiltshire Junior League until 1990, when they entered the Wiltshire Football League. Progressing through the county league, the club eventually won promotion to the Western League in 2004 where they remained until the 2006–07 season, after which the club withdrew from the league. The club also withdrew their reserve side from the  Wiltshire League, and are currently only competing in youth and junior football.

References

External links
Official site

Defunct football clubs in England
Association football clubs established in 1976
Defunct football clubs in Wiltshire
1976 establishments in England
Wiltshire Football League
Western Football League
Association football clubs disestablished in 2007